Neuro-Oncology is a monthly peer-reviewed medical journal covering cancer of the nervous system. It was established in 1999 and is published by Oxford University Press on behalf of the Society for Neuro-Oncology. The editor-in-chief is Kenneth Aldape. According to the Journal Citation Reports, the journal has a 2019 impact factor of 10.091.

References

External links

Oncology journals
Publications established in 1999
Oxford University Press academic journals
Monthly journals
English-language journals